Honolulu Waldorf School, established in 1961, is a coeducational, independent school serving more than 300 children from early childhood through middle school located on the island of Oahu in the State of Hawaii. It previously included high school levels.

History
The original Nursery through Grade 8 school was founded in 1961 and is located in Niu Valley.

The high school began in 1994 with its first freshmen class and graduated its first class of seniors in 1998. As of May, 2009 the high school campus was located in the Honolulu suburb of Kahala.  It was relocated to an oceanfront property at 5257 Kalanianaole Highway in Aina Haina, in August of the same year.

In 2018 a flood affected the institution. The school closed admissions to its high school and closed the high school building effective May 2019, and for the  2019-2020 school year only four students who had been 11th grade students the previous year were allowed to be in the high school. The school cited issues with lower numbers of students, causing a decrease in funding.

Campus
The K-8 is on a monkey pod tree-shaded campus in Niu Valley, at 350 Ulua Street, in East Honolulu CDP. In the 2000 U.S. Census the U.S. Census Bureau defined the K-8 campus as being in the urban Honolulu census-designated place. For the 2010 U.S. Census the bureau created a new census-designated place, East Honolulu.

The lower school in Niu Valley is graced by Giant Monkey pod trees and was known as Makau Campus while the former high school campus was in Aina Haina. It was known as the Makai Campus.

Curriculum
As a part of Waldorf education, the Honolulu Waldorf School teaches what is developmentally appropriate beginning in early childhood and ending at Grade 12.

In the high school, the academic year is apportioned into three to four week blocks called Main Lessons, whereby a subject such as science, history, math or English is taught for two hours every morning. Throughout the year students are presented a range of topics including oceanography, Shakespeare, botany, foundations of democracy, comedy and tragedy, Faust, zoology, biochemistry, physiology and analytical geometry.

Administration

Instead of school policies and curricula being created and maintained by a principal, the entire faculty administer the school through communal discussions and consensus decisions.

See also 
Waldorf education
Curriculum of the Waldorf schools
List of high schools in Hawaii
Interscholastic League of Honolulu

References

External links 
 

Waldorf schools in the United States
Private K-12 schools in Honolulu
Educational institutions established in 1961
1961 establishments in Hawaii
East Honolulu, Hawaii